Federal Zionism or Zionist federalism is an appraisal of federalism within the context of Zionism whereby the state of Israel is re-conceived as a federal nation-state with at least two sovereign divisions for both the Jewish-majority and Arab/Palestinian-majority areas.

Binational structure
While it may be similar in concept to the one-state solution and Isratine proposal, Federal Zionism focuses upon the entrenchment of the Jewish character and self-determination of the Jewish-majority component in such a federalized situation instead of an expanse of the Jewish population to a wider geographic area.

Federal Zionism may also call for the granting of certain jurisdictional powers of autonomy to regions within the State of Israel's Jewish majority areas, akin to the pseudo-federal structure of the Twelve Tribes of the ancient Israelites. For instance, one solution would be the partition of larger districts, such as South District, for the purpose of increased regional self-governance and self-responsibility.

The implications of a federalized binational structure could also result in a further demarcation between religious and secular populations in both ethnocultural communities, particularly as a result of prior withdrawal and self-segregation of more orthodox sects of Judaism from non-Orthodox 
populations.

Upper house
At the national level, the result would likely be the creation of an upper house of elected representatives of either the first-level subdivisions of Israel or of upper house-specific electoral districts in the Knesset, and the inclusion of Palestinian non-voting delegates to the lower house, similar to the relationship structure between the Commonwealths and federal government of the United States through non-voting delegates.

See also
 Brit Shalom
 One-state solution
 Isratine proposal

References

External links
"The Federal Idea Lives On" by Joel Pollak, a review of Yosef Gorny's "From Binational Society to Jewish State: Federal Concepts in Zionist Political Thought, 1920-1990"
"The Future Vision of the Palestinian Arabs in Israel" (in Hebrew, PDF in English) - a proposal by the National Committee for the Heads of the Arab Local Authorities and the Supreme Follow-up Committee of the Arabs in Israel

Federalism by country
One-state solution
Types of Zionism